The 1999 Babergh District Council election for the Babergh District Council in Suffolk was held on 6 May 1999.  The whole council was up for election and the council stayed under no overall control.

Election result

|}

4 Independent and 1 Conservative candidates were unopposed.

Ward results

External links
 1999 Babergh election result

1999 English local elections
1999
20th century in Suffolk